Crieff Community Hospital is a health facility in King Street, Crieff, Scotland. It is managed by NHS Tayside.

History
The facility was intended to replace the ageing Crieff Cottage Hospital on Pittenzie Street. It was designed by W. S. Atkins and opened 1995. It was sited conveniently close to the local GP-operated health centre which itself was replaced in 1901. Like other hospitals in remote areas in Scotland, Crieff Community Hospital has struggled to attract staff and started a programme of weekend closures in summer 2018.

References

Hospitals in Perth and Kinross
Hospital buildings completed in 1995
1995 establishments in Scotland
Hospitals established in 1995
NHS Scotland hospitals
Crieff